The 1981 NatWest Trophy was an English limited overs county cricket tournament which was held between 11 July and 5 September 1981. It
was the first NatWest Trophy since being renamed from the Gillette Cup.  The tournament was won by Derbyshire who defeated Northamptonshire by means of losing fewer wickets following a tie in the final at Lord's.

Format
The seventeen first-class counties were joined by five Minor Counties: Cheshire, Durham, Hertfordshire, Oxfordshire and Suffolk.  The Ireland team also participated.  Teams who won in the first round progressed to the second round. The winners in the second round then progressed to the quarter-final stage.  Winners from the quarter-finals then progressed to the semi-finals from which the winners then went on to the final at Lord's which was held on 5 September 1981.

First round

Second round

Quarter-finals

Semi-finals

Final

References

External links
CricketArchive tournament page 

Friends Provident Trophy seasons
Natwest Trophy, 1981
NatWest Group